Eufemio Abreu (born 1901 – death date unknown) was a Cuban baseball catcher in Negro league baseball and the Cuban League. He played from 1918 to 1925 with the Cuban Stars (West), Almendares, Habana, and the Indianapolis ABCs.

References

External links
 and Baseball-Reference Black Baseball Stats and  Seamheads 

1901 births
Year of death unknown
Almendares (baseball) players
Cuban Stars (West) players
Habana players
Indianapolis ABCs players
Sportspeople from Matanzas
Baseball catchers
Cuban expatriate baseball players in the United States